László Kordás (28 November 1969 – 30 January 2023) was a Hungarian trade unionist and politician. A member of the Democratic Coalition, he served in the National Assembly from 2022 to 2023.

Kordás died on 30 January 2023, at the age of 53.

References

1969 births
2023 deaths
Hungarian trade unionists
Members of the National Assembly of Hungary (2022–2026)
Democratic Coalition (Hungary) politicians
Politicians from Budapest